Sauzin is a municipality in the Vorpommern-Greifswald district, in Mecklenburg-Vorpommern, Germany. It consists of Sauzin and Ziemitz.

References

Vorpommern-Greifswald